Samuel Davis Mills III (born May 20, 1978) is an American football coach who has served as a defensive line coach for the Carolina Panthers and Washington Commanders of the National Football League (NFL). He is the son of Pro Football Hall of Famer Sam Mills.

Coaching career

Carolina Panthers
In 2005, Mills was hired by the Carolina Panthers as a strength and conditioning coach and defensive assistant. In 2006, Mills was promoted to defensive quality control coach. In 2011, Mills was promoted to assistant defensive line coach. In December 2018, Mills was promoted to defensive line coach after Brady Hoke was fired.

Washington Commanders
In January 2020, Mills was hired by the Washington Commanders as their defensive line coach. He was fired by the team in August 2022, with head coach Ron Rivera citing "philosophical differences" as the reason.

Personal life
He is the son of Sam Mills, a Pro Football Hall of Fame linebacker who played for the New Orleans Saints and Carolina Panthers in the 1980s and 1990s.

References

1978 births
Living people
African-American coaches of American football
Carolina Panthers coaches
Washington Commanders coaches
Montclair State Red Hawks football players
21st-century African-American sportspeople
20th-century African-American sportspeople